German submarine U-735 was a Type VIIC U-boat built for Nazi Germany's Kriegsmarine for service during World War II.

Design
German Type VIIC submarines were preceded by the shorter Type VIIB submarines. U-735 had a displacement of  when at the surface and  while submerged. She had two shafts and two  propellers.

U-735 was fitted with five  torpedo tubes (four fitted at the bow and one at the stern), fourteen torpedoes, one  SK C/35 naval gun, 220 rounds, and two twin  C/30 anti-aircraft guns. The boat had a complement of between forty-four and sixty.

Service history
U-735 served as a training boat preparing U-boat crews for service in the Atlantic Ocean. Her home base was Horten Naval Base in Norway, from which she operated on short coastal patrols, practicing in fjords and channels for submarine warfare. A Type VIIC U-boat, U-735 was very useful for preparing sailors and officers for service in modern boats, as opposed to the new models usually used in training.

Commissioned at Christmas 1942 in Danzig after an exceptionally long building period, U-735 was given to Oberleutnant zur See Hans-Joachim Börner, who remained in command of the boat right up to her destruction exactly two years later, when he was killed on board his ship. Dispatched to Norway, Börner soon became an expert on the Norwegian seaways, and was able to train a large number of sailors on his practice missions from Horten.

On the 28 December 1944, RAF Bomber Command sought to eradicate the menace of submarines sailing from Norwegian bases, and launched a major raid on Horten with 57 Avo Lancaster bombers. U-735 was anchored in the naval harbour at Horten. When the air raid alarm came at 21.30, U-735 eventually succeeded in leaving the harbour, having had trouble starting her diesels. At 23.30 NE of Horten she caught the full force of a bomb, sinking just outside the harbour, south of Mølen Island, with 26 men killed and ten missing, including her captain. Only one crew member survived, plus ten crew members who were on leave in Horten. She was the only U-boat to be lost in the attack. The wreck was rediscovered in a depth of 190 meters by a Royal Norwegian Navy divers from sub-sea surveillance ship,  in 1999. A high-resolution SAS image of the wreck which is in upright position made the cover of Sea Technology Magazine in June 2006  , and another SAS image of U-735  is made available by the Norwegian Defence Reseasrch Establishment.

References

Bibliography

External links

 "Memories from U-735", sole survivor  Die Versenkung von U-735 - Ein Zeitzeugenbericht des einzigen Überlebenden 1944 - YouTube

World War II submarines of Germany
German Type VIIC submarines
U-boats sunk by British aircraft
U-boats commissioned in 1942
U-boats sunk in 1944
World War II shipwrecks in the North Sea
1942 ships
Ships built in Danzig
Ships built by Schichau
Maritime incidents in December 1944